The 1995 Laurence Olivier Awards were held in 1995 in London celebrating excellence in West End theatre by the Society of London Theatre.

Winners and nominees
Details of winners (in bold) and nominees, in each award category, per the Society of London Theatre.

Productions with multiple nominations and awards
The following 24 productions, including two ballets and one opera, received multiple nominations:

 8: She Loves Me
 6: Les Parents terribles
 5: Oliver
 4: As You Like It, Le Cid and Once on This Island
 3: Broken Glass, Neville's Island, Pericles, Rutherford and Son and Sweet Bird of Youth
 2: Dead Funny, Design for Living, Fearful Symmetries, Ghosts, Glengarry Glen Ross, Hot Shoe Shuffle, My Night with Reg, Roméo et Juliette, Saint Joan, The Birthday Party, The Card, The Nutcracker and The Threepenny Opera

The following five productions, including one ballet, received multiple awards:

 5: She Loves Me
 2: As You Like It, Broken Glass, Fearful Symmetries and My Night with Reg

See also
 49th Tony Awards

References

External links
 Previous Olivier Winners – 1995

Laurence Olivier Awards ceremonies
Laurence Olivier Awards, 1995
Laurence Olivier Awards
Laurence Olivier Awards